Peace River South is a provincial electoral district for the Legislative Assembly of British Columbia, Canada. It was created under the name South Peace River by the Constitution Amendment Act, 1955, which split the old riding of Peace River into northern and southern portions for the 1956 BC election. Its current name has been in use since 1991.

Geography 
As of the 2020 provincial election, Peace River South comprises the southern portion of the Peace River Regional District, located in eastern British Columbia. The electoral district is bordered by Alberta in the east. Communities in the electoral district consist of Dawson Creek, Chetwynd, Tumbler Ridge and Pouce Coupe.

Member of Legislative Assembly 
This riding has elected the following Members of the Legislative Assembly:

History 

Its most recent Member of the Legislative Assembly (MLA) is Mike Bernier. He was first elected in 2013 and represents the British Columbia Liberal Party.

Election results

References

External links 
BC Stats Profile - 2001 (pdf)
Results of 2001 election (pdf)
2001 Expenditures
Results of 1996 election
1996 Expenditures
Results of 1991 election
1991 Expenditures
Website of the Legislative Assembly of British Columbia

British Columbia provincial electoral districts
Dawson Creek